PreussenElektra GmbH (former name: E.ON Kernkraft GmbH) is a subsidiary of the German utility E.ON. It is responsible for operation and decommissioning of the E.ON's nuclear assets.

After creation of E.ON in 2000, E.ON Kernkraft was created based on the nuclear assets of PreussenElektra AG and Bayernwerk AG. In July 2016, E.ON Kernkraft was renamed PreussenElektra GmbH.

PreussenElektra GmbH operates and owns 83% of the 1.4 GW Grohnde, 80% of the 1.4 GW Brokdorf, and 75% of the 1.5 GW Isar 2 nuclear power plants. Some of these are to be shut down by 2022. It is decommissioning Isar 1 and Unterweser nuclear power plants. It also holds (minority) stakes in the RWE-operated 1.3 GW Gundremmingen (25%) and 12% of the Emsland (1.3 GW) nuclear power plants. According to the assets swap deal between E.ON and RWE, RWE will acquire these minority stakes.

References

External links
 

E.ON
Nuclear power companies of Germany
Companies based in Hanover
German corporate subsidiaries